The 2007 IIHF European Champions Cup was the third edition of IIHF European Champions Cup. It was held in Saint Petersburg at the Ice Palace arena, from January 11 to January 14. The champions of 2006 of the six strongest hockey nations of Europe participate: Ak Bars Kazan (RUS), Färjestads BK (SWE), MsHK Žilina (SVK), HPK (FIN), HC Sparta Praha (CZE), HC Lugano (SUI).

Group A
Ivan Hlinka Division

Results
All times local (CET/UTC +1)

Standings

Group B
 Alexander Ragulin Division

Results
All times local (CET/UTC +1)

Standings

Gold medal game

External links
 Official site

1
1
IIHF European Champions Cup
2007